JA Solar Holdings is a solar development company founded in Yangpu district, Shanghai. They design, develop, manufacture and sell solar cell and solar module products and are based in the People’s Republic of China. The company is also engaged in the manufacturing and sales of monocrystalline and multicrystalline solar cells. It sells its products primarily through a team of sales and marketing personnel to solar module manufacturers, who assemble and integrate its solar cells into modules and systems that convert sunlight into electricity. It also manufactures a variety of standard and specialty solar modules. JA Solar Holdings also sells its products to customers in Germany, Italy, Sweden, Spain, South Korea, and the United States. The company was founded in 2005 and is based in Beijing, in the People’s Republic of China. In December 2009 investors began to notice the growing market share of JA Solar which was fueled by a large subsidy from the Chinese Government.

In February 2018 the company signed a deal with Manitu Solar for Manitu to distribute JA Solar's solar modules to markets in Eastern Europe.

See also

Solar power in China

References

External links
JA Solar Updates Agreement With BP Solar

Companies formerly listed on the Nasdaq
Solar energy companies of China
2007 initial public offerings
Manufacturing companies based in Beijing
Chinese brands